Jemina Pearl Abegg (born June 20, 1987) is an American singer and the frontwoman of Be Your Own Pet, a punk rock band she started when she was 16.

She appeared in the television series Gossip Girl, in a musical performance with Thurston Moore, covering the Ramones classic "Sheena Is a Punk Rocker".

Her debut solo album, Break It Up, was released on October 6, 2009. The album, co-written by John Eatherly, was released on Ecstatic Peace, and features guest appearances by Thurston Moore, Iggy Pop, Dave Sitek, and Derek Stanton of Awesome Color.

She is the daughter of musician/artist Jimmy Abegg.

From 2012 to 2013, she was part of a band called Ultras S/C with Chetley "Cheetah" Weise and Ben Swank, which opened for The Black Belles in November 2011.

References

External links 
 Jemina Pearl on Myspace

American punk rock singers
Women punk rock singers
1987 births
Living people
Singers from Tennessee
Place of birth missing (living people)
21st-century American singers
21st-century American women singers
Universal Motown Records artists
Ecstatic Peace! artists